Islam is both the official and majority religion in the United Arab Emirates, professed by approximately 62% of the population. The Al Nahyan and Al Maktoum ruling families adhere to Sunni Islam of Maliki school of jurisprudence. Many followers of the Hanbali school of Sunni Islam are found in Sharjah, Umm al-Quwain, Ras al-Khaimah and Ajman. Their followers include the Al Qasimi ruling family.  Other religions represented in the country including Christianity, Hinduism, Buddhism, Judaism and Sikhism are practiced by non-nationals.

Islam 

 

The constitution designates Islam as the official religion, with over 90% of the Emirati population are Sunni Islam. The vast majority of the remainder 5-10% are Shia Muslims, who are concentrated in the Emirates of Dubai and Sharjah. Although no official statistics are available for the breakdown between Sunni and Shia Muslims among noncitizen residents, media estimates suggest less than 20 percent of the noncitizen Muslim population are Shia.

The federal General Authority of Islamic Affairs and Endowments (Awqaf) oversee the administration of Sunni mosques, except in Dubai, where they are administered by the Dubai’s Islamic Affairs and Charitable Activities Department (IACAD). The Awqaf distributes weekly guidance to Sunni imams regarding the themes and content of khutbah with a published script every week which are posted on its website. The Awqaf applied a three-tier system in which junior imams followed the Awqaf khutbah script closely; midlevel imams prepared sermons according to the topic or subject matter selected by Awqaf authorities; and senior imams had the flexibility to choose their own subject for their khutbah. Some Shia religious leaders in Shia majority mosques chose to follow Awqaf-approved weekly addresses, while others write their own khutbah. The government funds and supports Sunni mosques, with the exception of those considered private, and all Sunni imams as considered government employees.

The Jaa'fari Affairs Council manages the Shia affairs for all of the country, including overseeing mosques and endowments. The council also issues additional instructions on sermons to Shia mosques. The government does not appoint religious leaders for Shia mosques. Shia adherents worship and maintain their own mosques and the government considers Shia mosques to be private. However, Shia mosques are eligible to receive funding from the government upon request. The government allows Shia mosques to broadcast the Shia adhan from their minarets. Shia Muslims have their own council, the Jaafari Affairs Council, to manage Shia
affairs, including overseeing mosques and community activities, managing financial affairs, and hiring preachers. The government permits Shia Muslims to observe Ashura in private gatherings, but not in public rallies.

For Muslims, the Sharia is the principal source of legislation. However, the judicial system allows for different types of law, depending on the case. Sharia forms the basis for judicial decisions in most family law matters for Muslims, such as marriage and divorce, and inheritance for Muslims. However, in the case of non-Muslims or noncitizens, the laws of their home country apply, rather than Sharia.

Christianity 
 

Catholics and Protestants form a large proportions of the Christian minority. The country has over 45 churches. The schools in public ownership have no Christian religious education. Many Christians in the United Arab Emirates are of Asian, African, and European descent, along with fellow Middle Eastern countries Lebanon, Syria, and other countries. In April 2020, a Latter-day Saint temple was announced in Dubai.

Hinduism, Sikhism and Jainism

Hinduism and Jainism are practiced by a large percentage of the community of Indians and Pakistani Sindhis living in the UAE. To acknowledge the contribution of the Indian business community towards the early development of Dubai as a trade port, Sheikh Rashid bin Saeed Al Maktoum granted the permission and the land to build a temple complex in Bur Dubai. There is also a Sikh Gurdwara south of Dubai, which is located in Jebel Ali. A second temple with over 16 deities was inaugrated in the 'Worship Village' in Jebel Ali on September 1, 2022.

Buddhism

Approximately 2% of the population, or nearly 500,000 people adhere to Buddhism; a temple is located in the Dubai neighbourhood of Jumeirah Buddhists in UAE consist largely of expatriate workers from countries in Asia with large Buddhist populations, such as Thailand, Nepal, and Sri Lanka.

Judaism

As of 2022, Judaism is experiencing a revival in the Emirates.

There is a small Jewish community in the United Arab Emirates (UAE). There is only one known synagogue, in Dubai, which has been open since 2008. The synagogue also welcomes visitors. As of 2019, according to Rabbi Marc Schneier of the Foundation for Ethnic Understanding, it is estimated that there are about 150 families to 3,000 Jews who live and worship freely in the UAE.

The synagogue in Dubai is supported by the UAE, with the appointment of a Minister for Tolerance in 2016. The Ministry of Tolerance led to the creation of the National Tolerance Programme and official recognition of the Jewish community in the UAE.

Another synagogue is planned to be built in Abu Dhabi, alongside a Mosque and a Church, as part of the Abrahamic Family House.

As of June 2020 community is headed by, the president of the Dubai Jewish Community, Solly Wolf, and Rabbi Levi Duchman. The community has Talmud Torah, Kosher Chicken Shechita and a permanent synagogue located in Dubai.

IMPACT-se launched a report in January 2022 about religious tolerance in the United Arab Emirates. Though the organization denied finding any anti-Semitic or hateful content in the textbooks, which “generally met” UNESCO peace and tolerance guidelines, it did cite the missing education about the Jewish state and its history. The textbooks in question reportedly taught about the 2020 Abraham Accords leading to the normalization of relations between the UAE and Israel, but skipped Israel in maps or education on the event of Holocaust.

Atheism

Up to 4% of people reported irreligious beliefs according to a Gallup poll. It is illegal for Muslims, with apostates from Islam facing a maximum sentence of the death penalty under the country's anti-blasphemy law. As such, there have been questions regarding freedom of religion in the United Arab Emirates.

Atheism in the region is mainly present among foreign expatriates and a very small number of local youth. According to Sultan Sooud Al-Qassemi, due to Islam being founded in the Arabian Peninsula over 1,400 years ago, the Persian Gulf region enjoys a long Islamic history and tradition, and it is strongly associated with national identity; thus, any distancing or criticism of religion "equates to distancing oneself from national identity". Al-Qassemi notes that the use of social media via the internet remains the strongest medium of expression for Gulf atheists, while providing anonymity; a pioneering Gulf blogger is the Emirati atheist Ahmed Ben Kerishan, who is known in the Arabic blogosphere for advocating atheist and secular views.

See also 

Freedom of religion in the United Arab Emirates
Bahá'í Faith in the United Arab Emirates

References